Resurgam is either of two submarines built in 1878 and 1879.

Resurgam may also refer to:
 Resurgam (album), a 2008 album by Alias
 Resurgam, a 2017 album by Fink
 Resurgam, a 1950 composition for brass band by Eric Ball
 "Resurgam", the motto of Portland, Maine, United States
 Resurgam, a fictional planet in Alastair Reynolds' novel Revelation Space
 Resurgam, a fictional hospital in the game Trauma Team from Atlus